Devota, in French: Sainte Dévote; died ca. 303 AD, a Christian saint killed during the persecutions of Diocletian and Maximian. She is the patron saint of Corsica and Monaco. 

Devota may also refer to:

1328 Devota, outer main-belt asteroid discovered by Jekhovsky, B. at Algiers
Devota (novel), by Augusta Jane Evans Wilson published in 1907